Shahram Haghighat Doost is an Iranian actor born on 18 March 1973 in Rasht, Iran.

Biography
His first cinematic experience was acting in the movie The Pear Tree directed by Dariush Mehrjui. His first serious appearances on television can be seen in the series Red Line directed by Ghasem Jafari and The story of a City make by Asghar Farhadi.

He was nominated for an award from the French Niss Film Festival for his role in the film Under the Smoky Roof directed by Pouran Derakhshandeh.

Filmography Excerpt
 Reverse directed by Poulad Kimiayi
 Under the Smoky Roof directed by Pouran Derakhshandeh
 King of Ear directed by Davood Mir-Bagheri
 Predicament directed by Mohammad Ali Sadjadi
 Love is not Closed directed by Bijan Birang
 Thirst directed by Mohammad Hossein Farahbakhsh
 Mokhtarnameh directed by Davood Mir-Bagheri
 Flying Passion directed by Yadollah Samadi
 The story of a City directed by Asghar Farhadi
 Red Line directed by Ghasem Jafari
 The Pear Tree directed by Dariush Mehrjui

References

External links

Shahram Haghighat Doost at iFilm
Shahram Haghighat Doost at Namava

1973 births
Living people
Iranian male actors
Iranian male film actors
Iranian male stage actors
Iranian male television actors
Islamic Azad University alumni